AISM may refer to:

 American International School of Medicine, Georgetown, Guyana 
 American International School of Monrovia, Monrovia, Liberia
 American International School of Mozambique, Maputo, Mozambique
 Annals of the Institute of Statistical Mathematics
 Australian International School, Malaysia, Selangor, Malaysia
 Association Internationale de Signalisation Maritime